Thomas Brown Tinney  (1855 – May 10, 1905) was a Major League Baseball right fielder who played in 32 games for the Washington Nationals of the Union Association in 1884.

References

External links

Major League Baseball right fielders
19th-century baseball players
Washington Nationals (UA) players
1855 births
1905 deaths